Gorgie Aggro were a notorious football firm of the 1980s and 90s, being associated with Heart of Midlothian F.C.

References 

British football hooligan firms
Gangs in Scotland